Prydki is a rural locality (a khutor) in Orekhovskoye Rural Settlement, Danilovsky District, Volgograd Oblast, Russia. The population was 30 as of 2010. There are 3 streets.

Geography 
Prydki is located in steppe, on the left bank of the Medveditsa River, 34 km northeast of Danilovka (the district's administrative centre) by road. Orekhovo is the nearest rural locality.

References 

Rural localities in Danilovsky District, Volgograd Oblast